Narayana Pisharadi R is a judge of the Kerala High Court in the Union Territory of Lakshadweep.

Early life and education
Pisharadi  was born on 26 December 1959 at North Paravur. He has completed his schooling from Sree Narayana High School, North Paravur, graduated from Union Christian College, Aluva and obtained a law degree from Government Law College, Ernakulam.

Career
He has Joined in service as High Court Assistant in 1981. Thereafter, joined Kerala Judicial Service as Judicial Magistrate of the II Class in 1986. He has served as Judicial Magistrate of the II Class and I Class, Munsiff, Sub Judge and Chief Judicial Magistrate, Judge, MACT, Additional District and Sessions Judge, District Judge at Thalassery and Ernakulam and Registrar (Vigilance), High Court of Kerala from 4 July 2016 to 30 November 2017 from where he was appointed as Additional Judge of the High Court on 30 November 2017.

References

Living people
Judges of the Kerala High Court
21st-century Indian judges
1959 births